Omna District is a district of Paktika Province, Afghanistan.  The district is within the heartland of the Sulaimankhel tribe of Ghilji Pashtuns. The estimated population in 2019 was 23,400.

References

Districts of Paktika Province